Yeşilhisar, formerly known as Kbistra, is a town and district of Kayseri Province in the Central Anatolia region of Turkey.

History 
Although the establishment of the district is not known for certain, first the Hittites and then the Persians came under the command of Alexander in 3500 BC. In 317 BC, this region came under the rule of the Roman Empire. Kbistra or Siyiera, which is mentioned among the eight big cities of the Cappadocia region, is today's Yeşilhisar. It's also sometimes referred to as Cyzistra.

Kbistra, which came under the rule of Iran in 256 BC and then again by the Byzantine Empire, passed into the hands of Muslims for the first time with the conquest of Battal Gazi in 672. Yeşilhisar came under the rule of Abbasids, Danishmends and Seljuks, İlhanlılar and Karamanoğulları in 1114, and Yeşilhisar came under the rule of the Ottomans in the time of Yıldırım Bayezid. Fatih Sultan Mehmet appointed Koçi Bey for the conquest of Yeşilhisar.

Economy 
The economy of the district is agriculture based. Irrigated agriculture is practiced on 60% of the 500,000 decares of land planted. Apples, apricots and other fruits are grown in irrigated areas. Sugar beet and potato are the leading industrial plants.

Places of Interest 
 Agios Eustatios Church in Güzelöz

References

Populated places in Kayseri Province
 
Towns in Turkey